Raḥmānān (Musnad: 𐩧𐩢𐩣𐩬𐩬 rḥmnn, "the Merciful") was a South Arabian epithet used by Christians, Jews, and pagans in South Arabia. Raḥmānān is usually followed by "Dhu Samawi", possibly "the out of heaven". During the Himyarite king Sumyafa Ashwa's reign, Jesus was referred to as Raḥmānān's son while during Abraha's reign, Jesus was the Messiah of Raḥmānān.

History 
The earliest known usage of the term is found in an inscription written in Akkadian and Aramaic and was dedicated to Hadad.

The early usage of the term rḥmnn in South Arabia is found in polytheistic inscriptions. It is found in inscriptions that are written in the late Sabaean language. Later, the epithet Raḥmānān was adopted by Jews and Christians in southern Arabia and these religions tried to replace the traditional pagan religions.

References 

Arabian gods
Christianity in Yemen
History of Yemen
Jewish Yemeni history
Sabaeans
South Arabia